Kiyoshi Uematsu Treviño (born 10 July 1978 in Portugalete, Spain) is a Spanish judoka. His father is Japanese and his mother is Spanish. His older brother, Kenji, is also a professional judoka.

Achievements

References

External links
 
 

1978 births
Living people
Spanish male judoka
Spanish people of Japanese descent
Judoka at the 2000 Summer Olympics
Judoka at the 2004 Summer Olympics
Judoka at the 2012 Summer Olympics
Olympic judoka of Spain
Mediterranean Games gold medalists for Spain
Mediterranean Games bronze medalists for Spain
Competitors at the 2005 Mediterranean Games
Competitors at the 2009 Mediterranean Games
Mediterranean Games medalists in judo
European Games competitors for Spain
Judoka at the 2015 European Games
21st-century Spanish people